The majority criterion is a single-winner voting system criterion, used to compare such systems.  The criterion states that "if one candidate is ranked first by a majority (more than 50%) of voters, then that candidate must win".

Some methods that comply with this criterion include any Condorcet method, Instant-runoff voting, Bucklin voting, and Plurality voting.

The criterion was originally defined in relation to methods which rely only on ranked ballots (voted preference orders of the candidates), so while ranked methods such as the Borda count fail the criterion under any definition, its application to methods which give weight to preference strength is disputed. For these methods, such as STAR voting, Score (Range) voting, Approval voting and Majority Judgment, the system may pass or fail depending on the definition of the criterion which is used.

Advocates of other voting systems contend that the majority criterion is actually a flaw of a voting system, and not a feature, since it can lead to a tyranny of the majority where a polarizing candidate is elected who is loved by a little over half of the population and hated by everyone else.  Other systems may be better at electing consensus candidates who have broader appeal, which is claimed to make them better representatives of the population as a whole.  These are described as "utilitarian" or "consensus-seeking" rather than "majoritarian".  Peter Emerson advocates for Borda count variants, arguing that majoritarianism is fundamentally flawed, and leads to bitterness, division, and violence, citing Northern Ireland and Bosnia as examples. Note however that in a utilitarian system, when no consensus candidate exists,  a minority's preference can beat a majority's preference by offering only slightly higher utility; thus, utilitarian methods need not always increase consensus. 

Note that the mutual majority criterion is a generalized form of the majority criterion meant to account for when the majority prefers multiple candidates above all others; voting methods which pass majority but fail mutual majority can encourage all but one of the majority's preferred candidates to drop out in order to ensure one of the majority-preferred candidates wins, creating a spoiler effect. The common choose-one first-past-the-post voting method is notable for this, as major parties vying to be preferred by a majority often attempt to prevent more than one of their candidates from running and splitting the vote by using primaries.

Comparison with the Condorcet criterion

By the majority criterion, a candidate X should win if a majority of voters answers affirmatively to the question 'Do you prefer X to every other candidate?'.

The Condorcet criterion is stronger. According to it, a candidate X should win if for every other candidate Y there is a plurality of voters that answers affirmatively to the question 'Do you prefer X to Y?'.

Satisfaction of the Condorcet criterion implies that of the majority criterion, but not vice versa. With the Condorcet criterion the individuals comprising the majorities of voters answering affirmatively may vary according to Y, but the majority criterion requires a single majority which has X as their first choice, preferred to every other candidate.

In the statement that Condorcet criterion is stronger than the majority criterion, the word criterion must be understood as a criterion that a voting system may or may not satisfy, not as a criterion that a candidate must satisfy in order to win the election.

Application of the majority criterion: controversy

The majority criterion applies to situations where a single candidate is preferred above all others by a majority of voters. In an election with three or more serious contenders, there is often no candidate ranked first by such a majority. Therefore, in elections with more than two major parties, the majority criterion is frequently irrelevant.

The majority criterion was initially defined with respect to voting systems based only on preference order. Even in situations where the majority criterion does come into play, it is ambiguous how to apply it to systems with absolute rating categories such as approval, score, and majority judgment.

For approval voting, the difficulty is that the criterion refers to an exclusive preference, and it is unstated whether this preference is actually indicated on the ballot or not. The common simple statement of the criterion, as given in the introduction to this article, does not resolve this, for the word "prefer" can refer to a mental state or to an action; a complete statement of the criterion would either refer to actual marks on the ballot showing the required preference, or it could refer to the mental state of the voters.

For majority judgment, the difficulty is different. There are presumed to be enough rating categories to express any salient mental preference. If the word "prefer" is interpreted in a relative sense, as rating the preferred candidate above any other candidate, the method does not pass, even with only two candidates; If the word "prefer" is interpreted in an absolute sense, as rating the preferred candidate with the highest available rating then it does if there are no ties.

Although the criterion's exact definition with respect to score voting is unclear, the result is not: unstrategic score voting does not pass this criterion under either definition. Strategic score voting, however behaves similarly to approval voting in this regard.

Examples

Approval voting 

It is ambiguous whether approval voting satisfies the majority criterion. Approval voting is not a ranked voting method, whereas the majority criterion has been created for ranked voting methods. There is a controversy how to interpret the definition for non-preferential voting methods.

In the strict sense, where a majority of voters consider one candidate better than all others, approval voting empowers those voters to elect their favorite candidate, but it does not force them to. Voters in a majority bloc can bullet vote to guarantee their top choice is elected. However, if some of those voters prefer to seek a consensus candidate with broader support, Approval voting allows them to do so.

If "prefer" includes an actual expression of the preference ("giving it a better vote"), then approval voting satisfies the majority criterion. On the other hand, if "prefer" does not include an actual expression of the preference on the ballot ("don't vote it worse"), then Approval voting fails the criterion as shown by the subsequent example.

Suppose 100 voters have the following preferences:

Next, suppose they cast the following votes:

B wins with 100 votes to A's 55 and C's 45. Note, however, that 55% of the voters indicated they approved of both B and A, and approval ballots have no way to indicate preferences between two different 'approved' candidates. So, although a 55% majority prefers A over every other candidate, B is elected because 100% of the voters consider him approvable. If the 55% voters preferring A had realized they were the majority, they could have voted for A alone, and A would have won with 55 votes to B's 45 and C's 45. Note, however, that if the voters are aware that A and B are the front-runners, they would be more likely to vote strategically, and it would be unusual for a majority of voters to approve both front-runners, as is the case in this example.

Borda count 

For example 100 voters cast the following votes:

A has 110 Borda points (55 × 2 + 35 × 0 + 10 × 0). B has 135 Borda points (55 × 1 + 35 × 2 + 10 × 1). C has 55 Borda points (55 × 0 + 35 × 1 + 10 × 2).

Candidate A is the first choice of a majority of voters but candidate B wins the election.

Score voting 

For example 100 voters cast the following votes:

Candidate B would win with a total of 80 × 9 + 20 × 10 = 720 + 200 = 920 rating points, versus 800 for candidate A.

Because candidate A is rated higher than candidate B by a (substantial) majority of the voters, but B is declared winner, this voting system fails to satisfy the criterion due to using additional information about the voters' opinion. Conversely, if the bloc of voters who rate A highest know they are in the majority, such as from pre-election polls, they can strategically give a maximal rating to A, a minimal rating to all others, and thereby guarantee the election of their favorite candidate. In this regard, score voting gives a majority the power to elect their favorite, but just as with approval voting, it does not force them to.

STAR voting

Majority judgment 

It is controversial how to interpret the term "prefer" in the definition of the criterion.

Criterion 1 
If "A is preferred" means that the voter gives a better grade to A than to every other candidate, this system can fail:

A is preferred by a majority, in fact by almost all voters, but B's median is Good and A's median is only Fair. B would win.

Criterion 2 
If "A is preferred" means that the voter uniquely top-rates candidate A, then this system passes the criterion. A candidate who is "preferred" in this sense by a majority of the voters will always be elected.

For example 100 voters cast the following votes:

Candidate A would win with a median rating of Excellent, versus Good for candidate B. Thus, this voting system satisfies the criterion in that case.

See also
 Mutual majority criterion
 Voting system
 Voting system criterion
 Condorcet criterion

References

Electoral system criteria